Leeds Dock (formerly New Dock and previously Clarence Dock) is a mixed development with retail, office and leisure presence by the River Aire in central Leeds, West Yorkshire, England. It has a large residential population in waterside apartments.

History 
The dock was constructed for boats using the Leeds and Liverpool Canal and the Aire and Calder Navigation to tranship goods and commodities from Leeds city centre in 1843. It was primarily used to bring coal from collieries around Rothwell and Wakefield to supply heavy industries in Hunslet and business and commerce in Leeds city centre.

The western side of the dock once had a large crane on tracks along the side of the dock to load and unload goods from canal barges.  In the 1990s the surrounding area was made up of Victorian industrial buildings most of which were derelict. Throughout the second half of the 20th century the area suffered steady industrial decline. The mills and many heavy engineering works began to close, move further out of town or scale down.
 
Construction of the £42.5 million purpose-built Royal Armouries Museum marked the start of the area's redevelopment which opened in March 1996. No further development was made until 2004 when a multi-storey car park opened followed by an Express hotel in August 2006. The retail and leisure sector was launched on 11 October 2008 with fashion shows from celebrity fashion consultant and TV presenter Gok Wan. However few retail chains were attracted to the area and the site failed to take off as a shopping centre.
 
The site, which had been known as Clarence Dock, became New Dock in mid-2012 as part of a re-branding initiative. The site was bought by Allied London, and rebranded as Leeds Dock in 2013.

Facilities 
Leeds Dock is the home of the Royal Armouries Museum, a major national museum. The site attracts around 1.5 million visitors a year. Although the site was originally intended to include a destination shopping centre, few shops opened and most of the shops that did open have since closed. Leeds Dock's main shopping street, 'The Boulevard'  radiates southbound from Armouries Square. Another focal point is 'The Anchorage' at the top of the dock. Clarence House is a  tower containing 227 apartments and six retail units.

Gallery

See also 
List of tallest buildings in Leeds
Architecture of Leeds

References

External links

 Leeds Dock official website

 

 
Buildings and structures in Leeds
Buildings and structures completed in 2007